United Left was a left-wing political party in Ireland founded in 2013. The founders were TDs Clare Daly and Joan Collins, who had been elected at the 2011 election as members of the Socialist Party and People Before Profit Alliance respectively. United Left was added to the official register of political parties in May 2013. Its registered officers were Daly, Collins, Declan Bree of Sligo County Council and Pat Dunne of Dublin City Council, all formerly of the United Left Alliance. As of December 2015, it is no longer a registered political party.

Election results

Local government elections

References

Politics of the Republic of Ireland
Defunct political parties in the Republic of Ireland
Political parties established in 2013
2013 establishments in Ireland
Socialist parties in Ireland
2015 disestablishments in Ireland
Political parties disestablished in 2015
Trotskyist organisations in Ireland